Esenli is a village in Akdeniz district  of Mersin Province, Turkey, which is a part of Greater Mersin. It is a village in Çukurova (Cilicia) plains. The population of the village was 408 as of 2012.

The village produces fruits and vegetables, especially grapes. A location at the east of the village named Çiftezeytin was proposed as one of the storage areas of Mersin city refuse, but the villagers of Esenli opposed to the proposal.

References

Villages in Akdeniz District